The discography of the rock band Santana formed by the Mexican-American rock guitarist Carlos Santana consists of 26 studio albums, 7 live albums, 61 singles, and 23 compilation albums.

Santana formed in 1967 in San Francisco and was originally known as the Carlos Santana Blues Band. The first members were Carlos Santana (lead guitar), Tom Fraser (rhythm guitar), Sergio "Gus" Rodriguez (bass guitar), Gregg Rolie (Hammond organ, lead vocals), Michael Carabello (percussion) and Danny Haro (drums). Its breakthrough began two years later, playing in the Woodstock festival. Over the next few years, lineup changes were common and frequent, and although retaining a basis of Latin rock, Carlos Santana's increasing involvement with guru Sri Chinmoy took the band further into more esoteric music, which continued for many years, although never quite losing the initial Latin influence.

Santana signed with Columbia and released their self-titled debut album Santana. This album reached fourth place on the Billboard 200 and earned two-times platinum status by the American national certification. Next, Santana released Abraxas, on September 1970, which topped the Billboard charts and earned five-times platinum. Santana released another twelve albums in the 1970s, each earning RIAA certifications, and their success continued in the 1980s. The band's quietest period was from 1984 through 1994, with no certified albums. After signing with Arista, the group released the very successful Supernatural, which reached number one in several countries, earned 15-times platinum and sold nearly 27 million copies worldwide. Their most recent album is 2021's Blessings and Miracles.

Over a career spanning 50 years, Santana exemplified Latin rock, while diversifying into other genres. Santana had sold over 100 million records as of 2010, along with ten Grammy Awards and three Latin Grammy Awards. Four albums reached number one in the Billboard charts (Abraxas, Santana III, Supernatural, Shaman) along with two number one singles ("Smooth", "Maria Maria").

Albums

Studio albums

Live albums

Compilation albums

Collaboration albums

Extended plays

Singles

Singles certification

Notes

See also
Carlos Santana discography
Santana videography

Notes

References

External links

 
 Unofficial German site
 

Discographies of American artists
Discography
Latin music discographies
Rock music group discographies
Discographies of Mexican artists